W. F. Kaynor Technical High School, or Kaynor Tech, is a technical high school located in Waterbury, Connecticut. Students from Waterbury and the surrounding towns can attend Kaynor. Kaynor Tech is part of the Connecticut Technical High School System.

History
Since opening in 1953, W.F. Kaynor Technical High School has undergone three expansion projects that have reflected the changing complexion of the community and have kept pace with technology. When the school was initially opened, ten trades were offered. In 1968, one of the trades, "Watch, Clock, and Instrument Making", was considered obsolete and was replaced by Electronics. In 1973 Automotive Collision Repair was moved into its new location after years of sharing space with Automotive Trade. Plumbing and Heating was also added at this time. In 1982, Culinary Arts was added. In 1985, Automatic Screw Machine was added, but a lack of interest by students, coupled with a decreased need in the community, resulted in termination of the program in 1989. In the 2006-2010 school year Health Technology was added. The Fashion shop was no longer available to be selected as of 2014. Beginning in the fall of 2015, Informational Systems Technology will be offered in its place.

Technologies
In addition to a complete academic program leading to a high school diploma, students attending Kaynor Tech receive training in one of the following trades and technologies:

Automotive Collision Repair and Refinishing
Automotive Technology
Carpentry
Computer-Aided Drafting and Design
Culinary Arts
Electrical
Electronics Technology
Hairdressing
Health Technology
Information Technology
Manufacturing Technology
Plumbing and Heating

Athletics

Fall Sports:
Cross Country
Volleyball
Boys Soccer
Girls Soccer: Co-op program with Sacred Heart High School (Started in 2018)
Boys Football: Co-op program with Sacred Heart High School and now also with Nonnewaug High School (Started in 2014)
Girls Swimming co-op program with Wilby High school (Started in 2016)

Winter Sports:
Boys Basketball
Girls Basketball
Boys Swimming co-op program with Wilby High school
Indoor Track

Spring Sports:
Baseball
Softball 
Golf
Track

Notable alumni

Scott Conant - Culinary, class of 1989. Conant has been on many cooking shows, including Top Chef, Chopped, and 24 Hour Restaurant Battle

References

External links
 

Buildings and structures in Waterbury, Connecticut
Schools in New Haven County, Connecticut
Public high schools in Connecticut
Educational institutions accredited by the Council on Occupational Education